Sally Bollinger is an actor, writer and cartoonist born in 1993 in New Zealand. She often works collaboratively with her sister Elsie on works relating to William Shakespeare and will contribute the comic component of joint comic/video projects.

Creative work

YouTube 
Along with Minnie Grace, Claris Jacobs and sister Elsie Bollinger, wrote, directed and produced a YouTube adaptation of the Shakespeare play Much Ado About Nothing, entitled Nothing Much To Do. Sally and Elsie grew up with Shakespeare stories and were also inspired by The Lizzie Bennet Diaries. They raised $23,000 for the project on a Kickstarter campaign.

Comics 
Sally contributed to the comic components of an adaptation of Hamlet by The Candle Wasters, titled Tragicomic. The comics drawn by Sally are intended to represent those drawn by the protagonist Hannah Moore during the course of the series. This adaptation gender swapped the characters to make women more central, and also had more of a focus on mental health.

Sally also contributed to the 2016 anthology Three Words featuring the work of female comic artists from New Zealand. First exposure to comics included The Adventures of Tintin and later a graphic novel of The Hobbit. Inspirations include Chris Riddell as well as other New Zealand cartoonists Dylan Horrocks and Tim Bollinger.

Sally and sister Elsie were asked by Robbie Nicol to contribute to the web and theatre series White Man Behind A Desk and he considers their existing popularity to have contributed to his success.

Bibliography 

 Three Words: An Anthology of Aotearoa/NZ Women's Comics (2016). Contributor.

References 

Living people
1993 births